Chen Halevi is an Israeli clarinettist, a native of the Negev desert. He studied the clarinet with Yitzchak Kazap and Richard Lesser, and later went on to study chamber music with Mordechai Rechtman and Chaim Taub.

Debut

Halevi debuted with the Israel Philharmonic Orchestra under the baton of Zubin Mehta. He has since performed with several orchestras across the world, including the Israel Philharmonic Orchestra, the Tokyo Symphony Orchestra, the European Soloists, the Heilbronn Chamber Orchestra, the Moscow Virtuosi, the Jerusalem Radio Orchestra, the MDR Philharmonic Leipzig, the NDR Sinfonieorchester Hamburg, and the Deutsche Symphonie-Orchester Berlin.

Career

Halevi is considered one of the world's leading virtuoso clarinetists—playing recitals, concertos, and chamber music with equal success. He is known for an impressive repertoire ranging from the most difficult contemporary music to early music on authentic ‘period’ instruments. Haaretz wrote: “ This boy is blessed with a wonderful fusion of artistic musicality and amazing playing technique, all in the service of the muses.” 

A frequent participant in summer festivals, Halevi has appeared at the Marlboro, Ravinia, and Santa Fe Festivals in the United States as well as European appearances at Schleswig Holstein, Colmar, Forcalquier, Prussia Cove, Davos, Rolandseck, Aldebburgh and Verbier Chamber Music Festivals, as well as the PMF Festival in Japan and the Perth International Arts Festival.

A great lover of chamber music, Halevi has performed with Pinchas Zukerman and Christoph Eschenbach, and numerous well-known string quartets including the Keller, Szymanowski, Fine arts, Miro, Prazac, St. Lawrence, Arcanto, Vogler and Kronos Quartets.  His close ties with composers has led him to perform a great number of works by, amongst others, Luciano Berio, György Kurtág, Magnus Lindberg, Osvaldo Golijov, Yan Maresz, Michael Jarrell, Brian Ferneyhough, Marco Stroppa, Bruno Mantovani and Thomas Adès. He is a dedicatee of a cycle of pieces by Denis Cohen, including Nodus for solo clarinet, Ombre for clarinet and electronics, and soft machine for clarinet and cello. Additionally, has performed Les asperges de la lune for solo clarinet by Sven-Ingo Koch, a clarinet trio by Lior Navok, and premiered Sven-Ingo Koch's Doppelgänger, a concerto for clarinet and orchestra.

Projects and Teaching

Halevi is now working on a recording project presenting an anthology of 20th Century music for clarinet and includes his selections of the solo, chamber music, concerto, and electronic works. He is currently the Clarinet Professor in the Trossingen Hochschule fur Musik in Germany—travelling around the world to give master classes on teaching and playing. Since 2007 he is a faculty member in the summer master classes at the Banff Centre.

In 2007, Halevi founded ClaRecords to commission, produce and record new pieces from today's leading composers as well as young and upcoming ones. ClaRecords also works with other modern art forms to stimulate dialogue between different modes of expression in the 21st century. In its first year, Clarecords had commissioned five new pieces and made a music video in 3D computer animation.

Footnotes

External links
Official Website
Banff Centre

Israeli classical musicians
Israeli classical clarinetists
Living people
21st-century clarinetists
Year of birth missing (living people)